Finally the Punk Rockers Are Taking Acid is a compilation album by The Flaming Lips, collecting their first three studio albums (Hear It Is, Oh My Gawd!!! and Telepathic Surgery) alongside their self-titled debut EP The Flaming Lips, and previously unreleased material and demo recordings.

It is the first of two releases archiving the band's Restless Records releases, and is followed by The Day They Shot a Hole in the Jesus Egg.

Track listing

Disc one
This disc contains all of the tracks from The Flaming Lips and Hear It Is (omitting the bonus track, "Summertime Blues," found on some releases of Hear It Is), plus four bonus tracks. The track list for this disc is misprinted, switching "Garden of Eyes/Forever is a Long Time" and "Scratchin' the Door."

Disc two
This disc contains all of the tracks from Oh My Gawd!!! as well as five bonus tracks.

Disc three
This disc contains all of the tracks from Telepathic Surgery as well as seven bonus tracks.

References

The Flaming Lips compilation albums
2002 compilation albums
Restless Records compilation albums